Feng Zhang (born October 22, 1981) is a Chinese-American biochemist. Zhang currently holds the James and Patricia Poitras Professorship in Neuroscience at the McGovern Institute for Brain Research and in the departments of Brain and Cognitive Sciences and Biological Engineering at the Massachusetts Institute of Technology. He also has appointments with the Broad Institute of MIT and Harvard (where he is a core member). He is most well known for his central role in the development of optogenetics and CRISPR technologies.

Early life and education
Zhang was born in China in 1981 and given the name 锋 (which means "point of a spear; edge of a tool; vanguard"). Both of his parents were computer programmers in China. At age 11, he moved to Iowa with his mother (his father was not able to join them for several years). He attended Theodore Roosevelt High School  and Central Academy in Des Moines, graduating in 2000. In 1999 he attended the acclaimed Research Science Institute at MIT, and in 2000 he won 3rd Place in the Intel Science Talent Search. He earned his BA in Chemistry and Physics from Harvard University in 2004 where he worked with Xiaowei Zhuang. He then received his PhD in chemical and biological engineering from Stanford University in 2009 under the guidance of Karl Deisseroth where he developed the technologies behind optogenetics with Edward Boyden.  He served as an independent Junior Fellow in the Harvard Society of Fellows.

Research
Zhang's lab is focused on using synthetic biology to develop technologies for genome and epigenome engineering to study neurobiology. He is a leader in the field of optogenetics, which was named the 2010 "Method of the Year". As a postdoc, he began work on using TAL effectors to control gene transcription.

Based on previous work by the Sylvain Moineau Lab, Zhang began work to harness and optimize the CRISPR system to work in human cells in early 2011. While Zhang's group was optimizing the Cas9 system in human cells, the collaborating groups of Emmanuelle Charpentier and Jennifer Doudna described a chimeric RNA design which is capable of facilitating cleavage of DNA using purified Cas9 protein and a synthetic guide. Zhang's group compared their RNA expression approach with a design based on the Doudna / Charpentier chimeric RNA for use in human cells and established features of the guide necessary for Cas9 to function effectively in mammalian cells which are dispensable in biochemical assays. Zhang, Doudna, and other colleagues from Harvard founded Editas Medicine in September 2013 to develop and commercialize CRISPR-based therapies.

Zhang discovered Cas13 with Harvard colleague Eugene Koonin using computational biology methods. In 2016, Zhang cofounded Arbor Biotechnologies to develop Cas13 for therapeutic use.

His lab has also developed a sensitive diagnostic nucleic acid detection protocol that is based on CRISPR termed SHERLOCK (Specific High sensitivity Enzymatic Reporter UnLOCKing) that is able to detect and distinguish strains of viruses and bacteria present in as low as attomolar (10−18 M) concentration. Zhang cofounded Sherlock Biosciences in 2018 to further develop this diagnostic technology.

Also in 2018, Zhang cofounded Beam Therapeutics with Editas cofounder and Harvard colleague David R. Liu to further advance Liu's work on base editing and prime editing.

He has an h-index of 109 according to Google Scholar.

Honors
Zhang is a recipient of the NIH Director's Pioneer Award and a 2012 Searle Scholar. He was named one of MIT Technology Reviews's TR35 in 2013. His work on optogenetics and CRISPR has been recognized by a number of awards, including: the 2011 Perl-UNC Prize (shared with Boyden and Deisseroth); the 2014 Alan T. Waterman Award, the National Science Foundation's highest honor that annually recognizes an outstanding researcher under the age of 35; the 2014 Gabbay Award (shared with Jennifer Doudna and Emmanuelle Charpentier); the 2014 Young Investigator Award from the Society for Neuroscience (shared with Diana Bautista). Zhang also received a New York Stem Cell Foundation (NYSCF) – Robertson Stem Cell Investigator Award in 2014, and was named the 2016 NYSCF – Robertson Stem Cell Prize Recipient. In 2015, Zhang became the inaugural recipient of Tsuneko & Reiji Okazaki Award (Nagoya University) and in 2016, he was once again (for the 2nd and 3rd time) sharing honors with Doudna and Charpentier when receiving the Gairdner Foundation International Award and the Tang Prize. In 2017 he received the Albany Medical Center Prize (jointly with Emmanuelle Charpentier, Jennifer Doudna, Luciano Marraffini, and Francisco Mojica)  and the Lemelson-MIT Prize. In 2019 he received the Harvey Prize of the Technion/Israel for the year 2018 (jointly with Emmanuelle Charpentier and Jennifer Doudna). In 2019, Zhang received the Golden Plate Award of the American Academy of Achievement. In 2021 he received the Richard Lounsbery Award.

In 2018, Zhang was elected as a Fellow of the American Academy of Arts and Sciences, and a member of the National Academy of Sciences, National Academy of Medicine.

References

External links
 
 
 
 
 
 
 

1982 births
Living people
American neuroscientists
Harvard College alumni
Stanford University School of Medicine alumni
Massachusetts Institute of Technology School of Science faculty
Synthetic biologists
Chinese emigrants to the United States
Chinese neuroscientists
American biochemists
Chinese biochemists
People from Shijiazhuang
Chemists from Hebei
Members of the United States National Academy of Sciences
Fellows of the American Academy of Arts and Sciences
Educators from Hebei
Biologists from Hebei
Theodore Roosevelt High School (Iowa) alumni
Members of the National Academy of Medicine